Lexa is both a surname and a given name. Notable people with the name include:

Surname:
 František Lexa (1876-1960), Czechoslovakian Egyptologist
 Stefan Lexa (born 1976), Austrian football (soccer) player
 Ivan Lexa (born 1961), Slovak politician and former head of the Secret Service

Given name:
 Lexa Doig (born 1973), Canadian actress

Fictional characters:
 Lexa Pierce, character in the television series Mutant X
 Lexa, the commander of the grounder clans in the TV series The 100